Ross Petty (born August 29, 1946) is a Canadian actor and theatre producer. He is best known for his eponymous production company, which staged what were promoted as "family musical" theatre productions in the British pantomime tradition in Toronto every holiday season from 1996 until 2022.

Early career 
Petty was born in Winnipeg, Manitoba, Canada.

In Europe, he sang at Le Lido in Paris and appeared with Betty Grable in the London West End musical Belle Starr. In the United States, he made his Broadway debut in Arthur Kopit's Wings, created the role of Eddie Dorrance on All My Children, and co-starred with Ginger Rogers and Sid Caesar in a national tour of Cole Porter’s Anything Goes.

He appeared in the U.S. and Canada in the title role of Stephen Sondheim’s Sweeney Todd, directed by Hal Prince. His film and television credits include Extreme Measures with Gene Hackman and Hugh Grant, Perry Mason, Spenser: For Hire, Monk, Loving Friends and Perfect Couples, Forever Knight, E.N.G., Night Heat, Seeing Things, Hot Shots, All My Children, A Judgement in Stone, Kung Fu: The Legend Continues, Counterstrike, The Secret Adventures of Jules Verne, Traders, F/X2 and Martha Inc: The Martha Stewart Story.

He has also done voices in several cartoon shows including X-Men, The Busy World of Richard Scarry, Bob and Margaret, Mythic Warriors: Guardians of the Legend, Bad Dog, Redwall, Mischief City, Ned's Newt, Jacob Two-Two, Monster Force, Ace Ventura: Pet Detective, Freaky Stories, Free Willy, Rupert, The Adventures of Tintin, Little Bear, RoboRoach, Birdz, Pippi Longstocking and Rescue Heroes.

Ross Petty Productions Christmas pantomimes
In the early-1980s,  pantomimes were staged at the Royal Alexandra Theatre by British producer Paul Elliott, who imported traditional English pantomimes using a primarily British cast complemented by some Canadian actors, which included Petty and his wife, Karen Kain. Petty also began co-producing the pantos with Elliott in 1986, and continued until Elliott decided to no longer present the shows in Toronto in 1996.

In 1996, Petty, through his Ross Petty Productions company, began producing what he termed "Fractured Fairy Tale Musicals". These musicals were performed at the Elgin and Winter Garden Theatre in Toronto, during the Christmas season (typically between late-November and early-January.) Petty's productions were based in the old English pantomime tradition, incorporating its broad comedy, winking asides that break the fourth wall, audience participation, and a man wearing a dress. However, Petty dropped the use of the principal boy while retaining the pantomime dame. To modernize his shows, Petty incorporated references to current, local, and/or pop cultural references and often used current popular music. Petty also adapted it to a Canadian audience, writing original scripts, using an all-Canadian cast.

Petty ensured his productions were family-friendly and appropriate for children, even while occasionally incorporating some "adult jokes". Referencing this, Petty commented, "The kids in the audience aren't going to understand those references...they are jokes for the adults." Additionally, Petty instructed his writers to take a feminist approach to the scripts so that characters such as Cinderella and Snow White "aren’t just pining after the prince" but are more assertive and independent. 

In 2006, Petty revived the 2004 production of Aladdin and embarked on a cross-Canada tour in November and December. The tour starred the same cast, which included former professional wrestler  Bret 'The Hitman' Hart, and had tour stops in Vancouver, Edmonton, Regina, Saskatoon, Calgary, Toronto, and Ottawa. 

Between 1996 and 2015, Petty appeared in his shows portraying the villain, who was usually dressed in drag (the pantomime dame). In 2015, Petty retired from performing following the production of Peter Pan, but continued as a producer. 

The 2017 production of A Christmas Carol was filmed, and later broadcast on Family Channel and  CBC as well as made available for purchase on DVD.

In 2020, Petty's planned production of Aladdin was cancelled because of the COVID-19 pandemic. Instead, There’s No Place Like Home For The Holidays was performed as an online revue. This allowed audiences to watch the show from home while still incorporating music, dance, comedy, and audience interaction. Petty's 2021 production, Alice in Winterland, was similarly presented online that allowed audiences to watch from home.

Petty announced that the 2022 show, Peter's Final Flight: The Pan-Tastical Family Musical, would be the company's final production, with Petty reprising his role as a villain for the final production.

Reception
Many of Petty's productions were well-received by Toronto theatre critics, and many of his shows performed to sell-out audiences.

Petty's productions have received praise for introducing theatre to children at a young age, with many noting that there was a lack of family-friendly theatre in the Toronto area. Toronto theatre critic J. Kelly Nestruck wrote that Petty's annual holiday pantos were one of the few options for family-friendly live entertainment in Toronto, with shows that contained comedy for both children and adults. Joshua Chong of the Toronto Star similarly referred to Petty's shows as being one of the few shows in Toronto where "...the whole family can have fun."

Petty has also been praised for his inclusion of drag performers in many of his shows. Petty's villainous characters were usually dressed in drag and Dan Chameroy's recurring "Plumbum" character was a comedic feminine-presenting character. Petty and his writers took care to ensure that "Plumbum" was presented with a sense of honesty and vulnerability.

However, Petty's productions have been criticized for their commercialism through product placement, as his shows project ads on a screen from their corporate sponsors during breaks in the show. Petty defended this decision, indicating that his shows would not be financially viable without commercial sponsorship. Since Petty's productions were for-profit, they were not eligible for government funding and had to rely on corporate sponsors to help subsidize the shows.

Petty's productions have also been criticized for their lack of racial diversity in casting. In 2014, Toronto theatre critic J. Kelly Nestruck felt the all-white casts were not reflective of Toronto's growing diversity and multiculturalism. In response, Petty complained to Nestruck's editor and said the comments were "out of line" and that he disagreed with the need for color-blind casting. In 2019, Toronto actor Kevin Vidal also criticized Petty for the lack of racial diversity in his shows. In 2020, Petty issued an apology. He acknowledged the importance of ensuring more racially diverse casts and the importance of doing so for children in their audiences, and also pledged to create more inclusive casting processes.

Production history 

 The 2020 production was a revue performed online due to the COVID-19 pandemic
 The 2021 production was performed virtually due to pandemic restrictions.

Personal life
He has been married to former National Ballet of Canada dancer and artistic director, Karen Kain since 1983. The couple reside in Toronto.

References

External links 
Ross Petty Productions

1946 births
Living people
Canadian male film actors
Canadian male television actors
Canadian male voice actors
Canadian male stage actors
Canadian theatre managers and producers
Male actors from Winnipeg
Pantomime dames
Ross Petty